The 2008 Shanghai International Film Festival is the 11th such festival devoted to international cinema to be held in Shanghai, China. It was held from June 14–22, 2008.  Hong Kong film director Wong Kar-wai was the head of jury at this year's film festival along with other jury members such as Chinese-American actress Joan Chen, legendary Danish director Bille August and Israeli stage actress Gila Almagor.

The competition lineup included films from China, Europe, Japan, Argentina, South Korea, Lithuania, Russia, the Czech Republic and New Zealand.  A total of 260 films were shown at this year's festival. Lithuanian film Loss was awarded two Golden Goblets - for best directing (Māris Martinsons) and best music (Andrius Mamontovas).

The 11th Shanghai International Film Festival was searching for a new film director to be the head of the SIFF jury, after the sudden death of Anthony Minghella.

Jury
This year's jury members are:
Wong Kar-wai (Director, Hong Kong, China, jury president)
Joan Chen (Actress, United States)
Ulrich Felsberg (Film producer, Germany)
Bille August (Director, Denmark)
Gila Almagor (Actress-writer, Israel)
Kaori Momoi (Actress, Japan)
Huo Jianqi (Director, China)

References

External links
Official website
 11th Shanghai International Film Festival from the Internet Movie Database

Shanghai International Film Festival
Shanghai International Film Festival
Shanghai
Shanghai
21st century in Shanghai